Lenny Venito (born May 10, 1969)  is an American actor, who has made appearances in movies such as Gigli, Men in Black 3, and War of the Worlds. He also starred as Marty Weaver in the ABC comedy The Neighbors and James "Murmur" Zancone on The Sopranos.

Life and career
Venito was born in Brooklyn, New York City. He appeared in a recurring role in The Sopranos as "Murmur." He also appeared as John, an incompetent mugger, in two episodes, "Mugged" and "Wingmen", of another HBO Series, Flight of the Conchords. Venito was cast in one episode of Ugly Betty, as well as in two episodes of Bored to Death. 

Venito participated in the 2008 Celebrity Poker Invitational.

Venito appeared in five episodes of NYPD Blue, most notably as Julian Pisano, a snitch with a heart of gold, a role he reprised in Blind Justice.

In 2007, he starred in the short-lived ABC sitcom The Knights of Prosperity as "Squatch."

From 2012 to 2014, Venito starred as Marty Weaver in the ABC comedy The Neighbors.

From 2014 to 2017, Venito voiced the recurring character Uncle Chuck on the Disney XD animated series Penn Zero: Part-Time Hero.

In 2016, Venito began co-starring in the CBS series Kevin Can Wait, portraying the role of Kevin Gable's friend Duffy.

Since 2019, he has been featured as "Uncle Cooper" in an ad campaign for Cooper Tires.

Filmography

Film

Television

Video games

References

External links

American male film actors
American male video game actors
American male voice actors
Living people
People from Staten Island
Male actors from New York City
1969 births
American people of Italian descent
People from Brooklyn
20th-century American male actors
21st-century American male actors